Memphis Pal Moore (born Thomas Wilson Moore) was an American boxer from Memphis, Tennessee, who claimed the World Bantamweight Championship in 1918 defeating championship claimant Johnny Ertle in Baltimore. He was rated as the seventeenth best bantamweight of all time by boxing.com, and was elected to the International Boxing Hall of Fame in 2010.

Managed by Tommy Walsh, Moore fought over 260 fights. He fought over thirty bouts with fifteen world champions, of which he impressively won nineteen.

Boxing record

Early boxing career
Moore was born on July 28, 1894, in Kenton, Tennessee.  Beginning in 1913 in the Memphis area, he was undefeated in his first 10 fights.

On March 25, 1915, Moore defeated Italian boxer Young Zulu Kid in a ten-round points decision in New Orleans, Louisiana.  He would defeat the talented Zulu Kid two more times, on January 13, 1916, in an eight-round points decision in his hometown of Memphis and on August 5, 1916, in a ten-round newspaper decision in Brooklyn.

On October 28, 1915, Moore defeated gifted boxer Kid Williams decisively in a non-title, eight-round newspaper decision of The Washington Post.  Williams was down twice in the bout.  Williams had taken the World Bantamweight Championship in June 1914 and held it through 1917.  As early as 1915, Moore had clearly identified himself as a top bantamweight and a serious contender for the World Bantamweight Championship, but he would be granted precious few shots at the title.

Defeating future bantamweight champion Pete Herman in early career

On November 15, 1915, Moore defeated Pete Herman for the first time in an eight-round points decision in Memphis, Tennessee.  On March 24, 1919, Moore likely defeated Herman again according to the eight-round newspaper decision of the Memphis Commercial Appeal on March 24, 1919, at the New Lyric Theatre in Memphis.  The bout was not recorded as a title match, but the title may have changed hands if Moore had knocked out Herman.  Herman held the World Bantamweight Championship almost continuously from January 1917 through September 1921 excluding the first seven months of 1921. Surprisingly, Moore never had the opportunity to challenge Herman again for the World Bantamweight Title.

On February 20, 1917, Moore first met Jack "Kid" Wolfe, losing in a fourth-round technical knockout in Cleveland, Ohio.  Moore claimed he had broken his arm in the bout.  Four months later, after healing, on June 18 of that year Moore defeated Wolfe in an eight-round points decision in his home of Memphis.  On May 3, 1920, Moore would defeat Wolfe again in an eighth round points decision at the Southern Athletic Club in Memphis. In his career, Wolfe would take a version of the Jr. Featherweight Championship in September 1922 against Joe Lynch, thought the NYSAC did not recognize the title.

Moore fought Frankie Burns in Boston to a draw on July 24, 1917, and in a loss by decision on August 2, 1918, in Jersey City, New Jersey.    Burns was a top-ranked bantamweight and would contend four times for the World Bantamweight Championship between 1912 and 1917.

First bouts with Joe Lynch 1917-8
On October 27, 1917, Moore first met Joe Lynch, drawing with him in ten rounds at the Fairmont Athletic Club in the Bronx.
On December 21, 1917, he lost to Lynch at Thornton, Rhode Island in a twelve-round points decision.  On January 11, 1918, he legitimately defeated Lynch in a twelve-round points decision in Providence.

Boxing and serving with the US Navy at Great Lakes Station around WWI
He honed his boxing skills while serving as a sailor in the United States Navy. He served as a boxing instructor while in the Navy.  He was selected as a boxing representative and sent to England for a tournament of the Allied nations after the end of World War I.   He served at the historic Great Lakes Naval Station outside Chicago, and completed his service shortly after 1919.

Claiming the World Bantamweight Championship, Johnny Ertle, April 1918
Moore fought Johnny Ertle claimant of the World Bantamweight championship in Baltimore on April 10, 1918, defeating Ertle by decision. The Indianapolis News wrote that Moore had taken the decision with "great ease". Moore claimed the World Bantamweight Championship as a result of this win, but was not universally recognized to have held the title and is not recognized today. Moore had first defeated Ertle in a controversial eight-round decision on April 5, 1916, in Memphis.

ISBA Allied Forces King's Trophy Bantamweight Competition

Moore fought Jimmy Wilde on July 17, 1919, in London, while still in the Navy.  The bout was part of the Finals for the ISBA King's Trophy Bantamweight Competition. Moore won by decision and took the King's Bantamweight Trophy by some American accounts, but officially lost the decision according to the British referee and judges present at the bout.  Wilde was the Welsh-born World Flyweight Champion impressively for seven years from 1916 to 1923, and held the title at the time of his bout with Moore.

Match with French champion Eugene Criqui, December 1919
On December 26, 1919, while still serving in the US Navy, Moore defeated the great French boxer Eugene Criqui at the Royal Albert Hall in Kensington, London in a fourteenth-round technical knockout.  According to the Scranton Republican, Criqui was "severely trounced" and the blow that ended the battle was a right hook to the stomach, which the referee did not call as a low blow.  The audience contained a number of Americans, including Moore's fellow navy companions. Criqui would hold the French Featherweight Title in 1921, the European Featherweight Title in 1922, and the World Featherweight Title in 1923.

On March 19, 1920, he defeated Johnny Buff in an eighth-round newspaper decision of the Wilkes-Barre Times Leader.  Buff would take the World Bantamweight Championship on September 23, 1921.  In another meeting, on December 15, 1921, Moore defeated Buff in a ten-round newspaper decision of the Milwaukee Journal in Milwaukee.

Bouts with 1920-21 World Bantamweight Champion Joe Lynch, most frequent opponent
Joe Lynch was Moore's most frequent opponent, meeting him ten times.  Fortunately for Lynch, he never fought a title bout with Moore based on points during Lynch's reign as bantamweight champion, but this was common during boxing's "no decision" era.  On May 24, 1920, Moore lost to Joe Lynch in the decision of The Jersey Journal in twelve rounds at Jersey City, New Jersey.  The Journal wrote that Moore slapped with his gloves, a tactic that sometimes lost him points in his fights, but that Lynch landed clean punches, giving him nine of the twelve rounds.  Nonetheless, Moore was observed as having put up a game fight, pressing the issue throughout the bout. Other sources considered the bout slightly closer. On October 26, 1920, Moore drew with Lynch according to the newspapers in St. Louis. Moore's holding cost him the decision as he carried the fight to his opponent in nearly every round. On May 6, 1921, Moore defeated Lynch in twelve by decision of the Courier Journal in Louisville, Kentucky. Other newspapers considered the bout too close to call, as in the twelfth round Lynch, reigning champion, tried hard to knockout Moore, and effectively used his left jab throughout.  Many spectators considered the bout the best between Moore and Lynch.

On September 4, 1922, the newspapers gave a twelve-round decision to Lynch in Indiana before a significant crowd of 8,000. In this instance, Lynch had a decisive victory, knocking Moore to the canvas twice in the seventh round, for counts of six and four. Jack Dempsey fought an exhibition in the first match before the crowded house.  On November 27, 1923, Moore defeated Lynch by a ten-round newspaper decision in St. Louis, though the match was considered close and dull by most newspaper accounts.  Lynch may have dealt a few blows which connected, but Moore's boxing and scientific defense did not seem as stellar as in his earlier career.  On February 24, 1926, Moore drew with Lynch in a ten-round points decision in Ft. Lauderdale, though a few newspapers gave Moore the edge.  On March 4, 1926, the Miami Daily News gave the decision to Moore in Miami. Many in the crowd jeered the boxers.

Moore fought Johnny Gannon  who was the bantamweight champion of the U.S. Army on March 16, 1921, to a ten-round draw in Rockford, Illinois. Moore fought Kid Pancho in Memphis, winning by decision.

Bouts with champion Sammy Mandell, 1921-2

On August 26, 1921, Moore first met Sammy Mandell in Aurora Illinois, losing in a ten-round newspaper decision of the Aurora Daily Star.  The bout was the main event of the evening. The Logansport Pharos Tribune believed Mandell may have had the edge in the fairly close bout but noted that "Moore displayed the greater cleverness and landed the most blows", but "Mandell's hitting was more effective". Mandell's strong display in the bout gained him notice a number of boxing reporters. He drew with Mandell in a newspaper decision in Memphis on July 4, 1922. In the fast bout, Mandell had a slight weight advantage and was considered the better puncher which forced Moore to use his speed and science to outbox his opponent. The bout was described as exciting with "The men...on their toes and slugging from the beginning until the end of the bout."  The referee present said if he had called the decision, he would have ruled for a draw.  Mandell took the World Lightweight Championship on July 3, 1926, and held it for four years.

Bouts with Bantamweight Champion Bud Taylor June 1922-January 1923
Moore fought Bud Taylor, holder of the NBA World Bantamweight Championship 1927-8, in four career bouts. Moore was diagnosed with pneumonia around February 9, 1922, and three weeks rest was recommended.  Moore's first match with Taylor was a newspaper win by the Aurora Daily Star in Illinois in ten rounds on June 23, 1922. As was not unusual in this stage of Moore's career, he was described as having performed a shade better in his boxing technique, but Taylor was described as landing more solid blows, though the bout was close. The second, Moore won by ten-round newspaper decision of the Chicago Tribune on the USS Commodore (IX-7) off Chicago on December 22, 1922. The third was a ten-round draw by newspaper decision in Indiana on January 15, 1923. Shortly after this bout, Moore expressed his intention to go after the World Flyweight Championship and perhaps face Pancho Villa, but a World Flyweight Championship Match never materialized for Moore. Moore drew in their fourth meeting on February 13, 1923, in Indianapolis by  a ten-round newspaper decision of two Indianapolis papers.  Once again, one source described Taylor as having connected with more blows in the close bout.  The bout was described as a "whale of a battle from start to finish", with each boxer exchanging the lead, though Taylor was described as landing more blows by several newspapers.

Moore also fought Frankie Genaro on April 23, 1923, in Chicago but lost in a sixth-round DQ.  The New York Times said the foul was an accidental upper cut to the groin.  The foul seemed unintentional as one account wrote that Genaro had jumped six inches off the floor into the punch.  According to the El Paso Herald, Moore's loss by foul was his first in eleven years of fighting. Genaro would take the NBA World Flyweight Championship on February 6, 1926, and hold it almost continuously until October 1931.

On December 9, 1924, Moore met the incomparable boxer Jimmy McLarnin before a packed house in Vernon, California, drawing in a four-round points decision. The "wild" bout was described as having abundant action and each boxer was given two rounds.  Moore was said to confuse his opponent with his "jumping jack" tactics, but had trouble landing solid blows.  Moore was known to prance and sometimes jump from the floor in his bouts.  The Los Angeles Times wrote that Moore introduced his own variation of the "kangaroo leap", and that he delivered frequent open gloved slaps to the back of McLarnin's neck, but was adept at keeping out of reach at long range in the close bout.  McLarnin would hold multiple weight division world titles in his career.

On July 12, 1927, Moore lost to reigning World Flyweight Champion Fidel LaBarba before a crowd of 18,000, at Wrigley Field, in Chicago, Illinois in a ten-round points decision.  A few newspapers said LaBarba had a clear victory, or that he landed cleaner, stiffer punches, against Moore who threw punches from every angle.  There were no knockdowns in the bout, nor obvious injuries.

Retirement from boxing, death and honors
Moore retired from boxing in 1930 after his last bout with Leroy Dougan in Memphis.  He died on March 15, 1953, reportedly from a stomach ulcer and a severe asthmatic condition that may have forced him from his ring career. He received twelve decisions over champions in his weight class, but each match was a no-decision bout, and received only newspaper decisions, rather than a points decision for a title.  Moore defeated Kid Williams, Joe Lynch, Pete Herman, and Johhny Buff by newspaper decision, and each held the Bantamweight Championship in their career.

In 2010, Pal Moore was selected to join the International Boxing Hall of Fame.

Professional boxing record
All information in this section is derived from BoxRec, unless otherwise stated.

Official record

All newspaper decisions are officially regarded as "no decision" bouts and are not counted in the win/loss/draw column.

Unofficial record

Record with the inclusion of newspaper decisions in the win/loss/draw column.

References

External links
 http://www.boxrec.com/media/index.php?title=Human:12311
 http://www.boxrec.com/list_bouts.php?human_id=12311&cat=boxer
 http://www.boxingscene.com/?m=show&id=21812 Top 25 Bantamweights of All Time

1894 births
1953 deaths
Boxers from Tennessee
Sportspeople from Memphis, Tennessee
People from Kenton, Tennessee
American male boxers
Bantamweight boxers